Agustina Albertarrio (born 1 January 1993) is an Argentine field hockey player. She plays with the Argentina national field hockey team, winning silver medal at the 2020 Summer Olympics.

Career 
At the 2013 Pan American Cup she won her first gold medal with the Argentina national field hockey team in an international tournament. Agustina also won the World League 2014–15 and the bronze medal at the 2014 World Cup.
She was part of the team that won the gold medal at the 2019 Pan American Games.

References

External links
 
 
 Agustina Albertarrio at the 2019 Pan American Games
 

1993 births
Living people
Argentine sportspeople of Italian descent
Argentine female field hockey players
Las Leonas players
Olympic field hockey players of Argentina
Pan American Games silver medalists for Argentina
Field hockey players at the 2010 Summer Youth Olympics
Field hockey players at the 2015 Pan American Games
Field hockey players at the 2016 Summer Olympics
Field hockey players at the 2020 Summer Olympics
Sportspeople from Buenos Aires Province
People from Adrogué
Pan American Games medalists in field hockey
South American Games gold medalists for Argentina
South American Games medalists in field hockey
Female field hockey forwards
Expatriate field hockey players
Argentine expatriate sportspeople in Belgium
Competitors at the 2014 South American Games
Pan American Games gold medalists for Argentina
Field hockey players at the 2019 Pan American Games
Medalists at the 2015 Pan American Games
Medalists at the 2019 Pan American Games
Olympic silver medalists for Argentina
Medalists at the 2020 Summer Olympics
Olympic medalists in field hockey
21st-century Argentine women